Saint Christopher is the largest expedition explorer yacht and privately registered displacement motor yacht, to fly the New Zealand flag.

It was originally a German built, Norwegian flagged steel cargo vessel, before being significantly overhauled to serve as an offshore rescue and supply vessel capable of recovering and accommodating 255 rescued persons in severe North Atlantic storm conditions. It was based in the North Sea. In 2011, it was refitted again, to undertake ultra-long range oil and gas research roles, cruising the world as the Guard Aleta. Some of her interior spaces were converted to more than 1,000m³ of fuel/cargo tank space. In 2016, she was sold to New Zealand based interests. Here, the vessel began another major re-purpose in Norway, between 2016 and 2017.

History
The Saint Christopher made global headlines in 2016, when part of an initiative designed to support Pacific Island countries in times of economic crisis, natural disaster, or other event, was made public. The catalyst for the headlines was economic pressure on small island developing states caused by banking limits in OECD countries. As part of an emergency physical settlement network, the Saint Christopher was to be a mid-ocean fueling vessel for planned cash and asset shipments for inter-bank settlements in Tonga, Samoa, Fiji and other nearby countries, while serving as a cyclone/hurricane and tsunami event recovery platform for the region at other times of the year.

Re-purpose

Following the expansion and foundation of APFII organisation, the high speed shipping routes were abandoned, and other vessels were sold off. The Saint Christopher was again re-purposed to stand in support of these remote parts of the world and protect fisheries and remove more than 1,000,000 kilograms of microplastic waste from the Pacific Ocean. Its former use as a small tanker, and as a supply vessel, with its large generator capacity, fire-fighting systems, and life support capacity, make it ideal for the region, including the requirement of being to be at sea for very extended periods of time.

Conversion

In 2017, after the Saint Christopher completed its 5-year and 10-year surveys, and was no-longer required for commercial maritime operations by APFII.org, she was re-classified and re-registered as a private yacht, and given a New Zealand flag. Significant modifications were made, with new crew areas, new dining, recreational, and living spaces, as well as considerable hull and exterior work, and styling changes. Guest areas were laid out, and she was modified to carry up to 28 persons in high levels of comfort, covering both guests and crew. Her bow-thrusters were upgraded, and new ships' tenders were added. She is intended to be used in both Polar waters, but primarily the tropical climates of the South Pacific.

Features
 6 guest cabins - accommodation for 12, average floor space, 86 square meters.
 Solar Powered interior and exterior electric systems, including LED lights and climate controls, for eco-friendly, ultra-long-range cruising.
 Interior main stair well and atrium, passing through four levels.
 Media Lounge, and 24-seat board room, for event coverage and media broadcasting.
 Sick-bay and medical center.
 286 square meter owner's deck, with study, nursery, library, his/hers walk in wardrobes and bathrooms.
 Life saving equipment for 480 persons.
 Double Hulled, with an Ice Class-C rating (DNV)
  fuel capacity (formerly 680 cubic meters) giving  range on low fuel burn (7-8 knots).
 An experimental pyrolytic reactor, partially energised via solar power, to extend range.
 Single shaft  main engine with controllable pitch propeller, a 210kwE bow tunnel thruster, and a  retractable 360 degree Schottel secondary drive.
 7.2 meter custom tender with a v8, 5.8 liter inboard petrol motor.
 3.35m Novurania 335 DL Day-tender.

References

Motor yachts
Individual yachts
Ships of New Zealand
1970s ships